The Sacrifice of Ellen Larsen (German: Das Opfer der Ellen Larsen) is a 1921 German silent film directed by Paul L. Stein and starring Alfred Abel and Marija Leiko.

The film's art direction was by Kurt Richter.

Cast
In alphabetical order
Alfred Abel as Norbert Larsen
Willy Kaiser-Heyl as Magnus, moneylender
Arnold Korff as Rasmussen - General manager
Marija Leiko as Ellen Larsen
Karl Platen as Dr. Hennings 
Paul Richter as Gert
Marga von Kierska

References

External links

Films of the Weimar Republic
Films directed by Paul L. Stein
German silent feature films
UFA GmbH films
German black-and-white films